This page lists Japan-related articles with romanized titles beginning with the letter E. For names of people, please list by surname (i.e., "Tarō Yamada" should be listed under "Y", not "T"). Please also ignore particles (e.g. "a", "an", "the") when listing articles (i.e., "A City with No People" should be listed under "City").

E
E1 Series Shinkansen
E2 Series Shinkansen
E3 Series Shinkansen
E4 Series Shinkansen

Ea
EarthBound
Earth Federation
East Asian languages
East China Sea
East Japan Railway Company

Eb
Ebetsu, Hokkaidō
Ebina, Kanagawa
Ebino, Miyazaki
Ebirah, Horror of the Deep
Ebisu Station (Hyōgo)
Ebisu Station (Tokyo)

Ec
Ecchi
Echi District, Shiga
Echigawa, Shiga
Echigo Province
Echizen Province
EcoCute
Economic history of Japan
Economy of Japan

Ed
Edo
Edo period
Edogawa Ranpo
Edogawa, Tokyo
Education in Japan
Educational reform in occupied Japan

Eh
Ehime Prefecture
Ehime Maru incident
Ehrgeiz

Ei
Ei, Kagoshima
Eigenji, Shiga
Eikaiwa
Eirin
Eisai
El-Hazard

Ek
Kaori Ekuni

El
Elections in Japan

Em
Emishi
Emoji
Emperor Ankan
Emperor Ankō
Emperor Annei
Emperor Antoku
Emperor Bidatsu
Emperor Buretsu
Emperor Chōkei
Emperor Chūai
Emperor Chūkyō
Emperor Daigo
Emperor En'yū
Emperor Fushimi
Emperor Go-Daigo
Emperor Go-En'yū
Emperor Go-Fukakusa
Emperor Go-Fushimi
Emperor Go-Hanazono
Emperor Go-Horikawa
Emperor Go-Ichijō
Emperor Go-Kameyama
Emperor Go-Kashiwabara
Emperor Go-Kōgon
Emperor Go-Komatsu
Emperor Go-Kōmyō
Emperor Go-Mizunoo
Emperor Go-Momozono
Emperor Go-Murakami
Emperor Go-Nara
Emperor Go-Nijō
Emperor Go-Reizei
Emperor Go-Saga
Emperor Go-Sai
Emperor Go-Sanjō
Emperor Go-Shirakawa
Emperor Go-Suzaku
Emperor Go-Toba
Emperor Go-Tsuchimikado
Emperor Go-Uda
Emperor Go-Yōzei
Emperor Hanazono
Emperor Hanzei
Emperor Heizei
Emperor Higashiyama
Emperor Horikawa
Emperor Ichijō
Emperor Ingyō
Emperor Itoku
Emperor Jimmu
Emperor Jomei
Emperor Junna
Emperor Junnin
Emperor Juntoku
Emperor Kaika
Emperor Kameyama
Emperor Kanmu
Emperor Kazan
Emperor Keikō
Emperor Keitai
Emperor Kenzō
Emperor Kinmei

Em (cont'd)
Emperor Kōan
Emperor Kōbun
Emperor Kōgen
Emperor Kōgon
Emperor Kōkaku
Emperor Kōkō
Emperor Kōmei
Emperor Kōmyō
Emperor Kōnin
Emperor Konoe
Emperor Kōrei
Emperor Kōshō
Emperor Kōtoku
Emperor Meiji
Emperor Momozono
Emperor Monmu
Emperor Montoku
Emperor Murakami
Emperor Nakamikado
Emperor Nijō
Emperor Ninmyō
Emperor Ninken
Emperor Ninkō
Emperor Nintoku
Emperor Ōgimachi
Emperor Ōjin
Emperor Reigen
Emperor Reizei
Emperor Richū
Emperor Rokujō
Emperor Saga
Emperor Sakuramachi
Emperor Sanjō
Emperor Seamounts
Emperor Seimu
Emperor Seinei
Emperor Seiwa
Emperor Senka
Emperor Shijō
Emperor Shirakawa
Emperor Shōkō
Emperor Shōmu
Emperor Suinin
Emperor Suizei
Emperor Sujin
Emperor Sukō
Emperor Sushun
Emperor Sutoku
Emperor Suzaku
Emperor Takakura
Emperor Taishō
Emperor Tenmu
Emperor Tenji
Emperor Toba
Emperor Tsuchimikado
Emperor Uda
Emperor Yōmei
Emperor Yōzei
Emperor Yūryaku
The Emperor's Birthday
Empress Genmei
Empress Genshō
Empress Go-Sakuramachi
Empress Jitō
Empress Kōgyoku
Empress Kōken
Empress Meishō
Empress Saimei
Empress Suiko

En
Ena, Gifu
Ena District, Gifu
Shūsaku Endō
Engrish
Eniwa, Hokkaidō
Enjo kōsai
Enka
Ennichi
Ennin
Enokitake
Enola Gay
Enomoto Takeaki
Enoshima
Enoshima Engi
Enryaku-ji
Enzan

Es
Esaki Leona
Esashi, Iwate
Esashi, Hokkaidō (Hiyama)
Esashi, Hokkaidō (Soya)
Esashi District, Hokkaidō
Makiko Esumi

Et
Etajima, Hiroshima
Etchū Province
Ethnic issues in Japan
Ethnic Japanese
Etranger di Costarica

Eu
Eulenburg Expedition

Ev
Everlasting (Every Little Thing album)
Every Little Thing (band)

Ex
Excel Saga
Extended Unix Code

E